Poronin , is a village in southern Poland situated in Tatra County of the Lesser Poland Voivodeship since 1999 (it was previously in Nowy Sącz Voivodeship from 1975-1998).

At the beginning of WWI Vladimir Lenin and Nadezhda Krupskaya were staying in Poronin, they were arrested on suspicion of being Russian spies but released soon after.

References

Villages in Tatra County